Mrs. M. P. Sargent House is located at 426 Topeka Street in Kingman, Arizona. The house was built in 1897. The home is of Queen Anne style. The house was added to the National Register of Historic Places on May 14, 1986, and its number is 86001167.

It was evaluated for National Register listing as part of a 1985 study of 63 historic resources in Kingman that led to this and many others being listed.

References

Queen Anne architecture in Arizona
Houses completed in 1897
Houses on the National Register of Historic Places in Arizona
Houses in Kingman, Arizona
National Register of Historic Places in Kingman, Arizona